'The Trio No. 1 in G minor for piano, violin, and cello, Op. 15', was written in 1855 by Bedřich Smetana initially as his Opus 9. Following some revision, he had finished and premiered the revised work in Sweden in 1858. The work would then be officially published in 1880. This piece was dedicated to the memory of his eldest daughter, Bedřiška. This work happens to feature paraphrases and quotations of his previous Piano Sonata in G Minor JB 3:24 (1846). This work takes approximately 28–32 minutes to perform.

Structure 
This piano trio contains three movements:

I. Moderato Assai

The first movement (3/4, g minor) follows a sonata form beginning with a 7 measure Violin solo that is in the lowest register (Sul G) that starts on the Dominant. These seven measures will indicate the first theme that will also be featured in the development of the work. The second theme is introduced in measure 48 featuring the Cello (with Piano Accompaniment). This theme can be identified as more diatonic in contrast to the first, and it is expanded on in the Più Animato section of the movement. There is a Tempo Rubato section that will lead to the Recapitulation that has the first theme abridged by the Violin solo once again. This piece ends with a Coda that is an elaboration of the first theme reiterated in the Tonic. This movement ends with three sforzandi that have varying inversions of G Minor.

II. Allegro, Ma Non Agitato

The second movement (2/4, g minor) is most reminiscent to a Scherzo featuring two Trios, but identified as Alternativo I and II. Similar to the beginning of the first movement, the Piano and Cello (instead of the Violin) start on the letter D, and make their way to the Tonic much quicker with three ascending notes highlighting a harmonic minor. The piano will then start the first theme in the pickup to measure 9. In the first Alternativo, both the Cello and Violin have similar thematic material during their respective espressivos that are both repeated twice. In the second Alternativo, a sharp contrast is made in volume as all three instruments have a much louder chordal texture featuring a new rhythmic motive (dotted eighth->sixteenth) included. This second Alternativo is a premonition to the funeral march in the final movement. As the final reiteration of the A section returns, there is a chromatic interjection quoting from the first movement before ending in the key of G Major.

III. Presto

The final movement (6/8, g minor) is the movement that most strikingly similar to Smetana's Sonata in g minor (Movement IV Finale Molto Vivace). The first theme and the "two-versus-three" figures are nearly identical. The orchestration accommodates the Violin and Cello as accompaniment figures to the piano until the arrival of the second theme. The second theme starts initially with the Cello quoting a variant of the second theme of the first movement. The Violin plays a variation of this, followed by the piano's cadenza-like variation. After this, the second theme takes another form in the Più Mosso section that transitions back to the first "two-versus-three" theme. After a more chordal version of the first theme, there is a reiteration of the second theme which has more of an improvisatory like accompaniment provided by the piano. Following the additional Più Mosso section, the piano starts playing the first theme in a more block-chord format which will then transition the ensemble into a short funeral march written in 2/4 and 6/8. After this march, the second theme is reiterated one last time in the major mode with arpeggiations as textural accompaniment. The piece arrives to a conclusion as the first theme is reiterated with an altered ending in the key of G Major.

Reception 
There were mixed feelings in the initial 1855 premiere, but Franz Liszt had enjoyed it separately when paying a visit to Smetana in Bohemia. Motivated by Liszt's endorsement, Smetana revised his work to a much warmer reception in Sweden. He would go on to publish his work in 1880

Discography 
Lev Oborin, piano; David Oistrakh, violin; Sviatoslav Knushevitsky, cello (Studio Recording, Moscow, 1950)

Daniil Trifonov, piano; Leonidas Kavakos, violin; Gautier Capucon, cello (Verbier Festival, Switzerland, 2016)

References 

Compositions by Bedřich Smetana